Markus Zberg (born June 27, 1974 in Altdorf, Uri) is a retired Swiss professional road bicycle racer; he is the younger brother of Beat Zberg. Zberg retired after a severe fall in the Tour de l'Ain. He was the Swiss National Road Race champion in 2000 and 2008.

Major results

1996
 1st Stage 5 Grand Prix Guillaume Tell
1997
 1st Stage 7 Tour de Pologne
1998
 Vuelta a España
1st Stages 1 & 22
 1st Stausee-Rundfahrt Klingnau
 1st Stage 3 Tour de Suisse
 1st Stage 6 Settimana Ciclistica Lombarda
1999
 1st Milano–Torino
 2nd  Road race, UCI Road World Championships
 2nd Overall Paris–Nice
 2nd GP Ouest–France
2000
 1st  Road race, National Road Championships
 3rd Amstel Gold Race
2001
 1st Rund um den Henninger Turm
 1st Stage 3 Tirreno–Adriatico
 4th Amstel Gold Race
2002
 3rd Milan–San Remo
2003
 3rd Tre Valli Varesine
2004
 2nd Grand Prix of Aargau Canton
2005
 3rd Rund um den Henninger Turm
2006
 1st Stage 7 Paris–Nice
2008
 1st  Road race, National Road Championships

References

External links 
Team profile
Official Website

1974 births
Living people
Swiss male cyclists
Olympic cyclists of Switzerland
Cyclists at the 2000 Summer Olympics
Cyclists at the 2004 Summer Olympics
People from the canton of Uri
Tour de Suisse stage winners